Antonovych is a Slavic surname according to Slavic naming customs. Notable people with this name include the following

Dmytro Antonovych (1877 – 1945), Ukrainian politician 
Volodymyr Antonovych (1834 – 1908), Ukrainian historian, archivist and archeologist

See also

Antonovich, surname

Patronymic surnames